St Michael and All Angels’ Church, Waddesdon is a Grade II* listed parish church in the Church of England in Waddesdon, Buckinghamshire.

History

The church dates from the late 12th century.

The three middle columns of the south arcade of the nave, and the west respond, which are of the late 12th century.. The chancel was rebuilt at the same time. Around 1340 the north aisle was added, and towards the end of the 14th century the chancel was widened on the north and the tower was erected.

The eastern half of the south wall of the chancel was rebuilt in the second half of the 15th century, and the clearstory was added to the nave. The south porch was added at the same time, but has subsequently been rebuilt. The church was restored in 1863 under the supervision of the architect J. Chatwin. New bells were inserted in the tower. The stonework of the pillars was renewed where it had deteriorated. The nave, aisles and chancel were paved with blue and red Stafford tiles and the heating apparatus was provided by Rimington of Yorkshire. New seating was provided of stained deal.

The cornerstone of the new tower was laid by the Bishop of Reading on 20 October 1891. The new tower was dedicated on 15 June 1892. The church was restored in 1902.

The church's patron is the Duke of Marlborough. The font was originally in the chapel at Blenheim Palace, but was given to Waddesdon by Charles Spencer-Churchill, 9th Duke of Marlborough in thanksgiving for his safe return from the Second Boer War.

Parish status
The church is in a joint parish with:
St Martin's Church, Dunton
St John the Baptist's Church, Granborough
St Mary the Virgin's Church, Hardwick with Weedon
Old School Room Chapel, Weedon
Holy Cross Church, Hoggeston
Church of the Assumption of the Blessed Virgin Mary, North Marston
All Saints’ Church, Oving with Pitchcott
Holy Cross and St Mary's Church, Quainton
St Mary Magdalene's Church, Over Winchendon
St Mary the Virgin's Church, Westcott
St John the Evangelist's Church, Whitchurch

Memorials

Guy Carleton (d. 1608)
Christian Wake (d. 1609)
John Ellis (ca. 1700)
Henry Wilkinson (d. 1647)
Robert Piggott
Hugh Bristowe (d. 1548)
Robert Huntyndon (d. 1543)
Sir Roger Dynham (d. 1490)

Stained glass

Organ

The pipe organ dates from 1913 and was built by William Hill & Sons. A specification of the organ can be found on the National Pipe Organ Register.

References

Church of England church buildings in Buckinghamshire
Grade II* listed churches in Buckinghamshire